Universal Typeface may refer to:

 The Universal typeface of Herbert Bayer, one of the Bauhaus typefaces.
 The Universal Typeface Experiment, a crowdsourced typeface